"Paul Wong (born November 20, 1954 in Prince Rupert, British Columbia) is a Canadian multimedia artist.  An award-winning artist, curator, and organizer of public interventions since the mid-1970s, Wong is known for his engagement with issues of race, sex, and death. His work varies from conceptual performances to narratives, meshing video, photography, installation, and performance with Chinese-Canadian cultural perspectives".

"Wong is a founding member of several artists groups including the Video In /  VIVO Media Arts Centre (Satellite Video Exchange Society 1973), and is a co-founding member of On The Cutting Edge Productions Society, which produced projects nationally and internationally from 1985 to 2007. These are archived at  www.onedge.tv. On Edge was rebranded to On Main Gallery in 2007  www.onmaingallery.com.  As Artistic Director/Curator, Wong shifted the focus back to Vancouver".

Curatorial work 
He was the lead artist and curator of the "5" series, a major media art spectacle commissioned by the City of Vancouver for the 2010 Winter Olympics. These five site-specific events took place between February 13 to March 13, 2010, showcasing works from both Wong and selected guest artists.  Produced by On Main Gallery, the event was part of Mapping and Marking Artist-Initiated Projects for Vancouver 2010.

In 2011, he curated 10 Seconds, another City of Vancouver Public Art Project that saw the commissioning of 10 artists creating new works for the Canada Line SkyTrain video screens in Vancouver.

In 2013, Wong created the #OMGSMAZ" social media art zones for the 2013 Main Street Car Free Day and the Kitsilano Music Festival, and "Year of GIF" for the City of Surrey's Surrey UrbanScreen.

In 2014, Wong created "#LLL, Looking Listening Looping", and was the curator and artistic director of Thru the Trapdoor, an interdisciplinary art exhibition and event that took place from April 22 to 26, 2014. The event featured over 50 artists and curators.

Wong, along with the other members of the Mainstreeters, is featured in Mainstreeters: Taking Advantage 1972-1982. Curated by Allison Collins and Michael Turner, and produced by grunt gallery, the exhibition surveys the history of a gang of Vancouver artists who lived and worked together.

Collections
Wong's works are in public collections including the National Gallery of Canada, the Museum of Modern Art, New York, the Canada Council Art Bank (Ottawa) and the Vancouver Art Gallery.

Awards
Wong was awarded the Bell Canada Award in Video Art in 1992. He was also the first recipient of the Transforming Art Award from the Asian Heritage Foundation in 2002.  In 2003 he was the inaugural winner of the Trailblazer Expressions Award, created by Heritage Canada, the National Film Board of Canada and CHUM limited.

In 2005, Wong was a recipient of a Governor General's Awards in Visual and Media Arts. Wong was the Canadian Spotlight Artist and also awarded Best Canadian Film or Video at the 2008 Toronto Reel Asian International Film Festival.

In 2016 Wong was the recipient of the Audain Prize for Lifetime Achievement in the Visual Arts.

Other media 
Wong plays the "Wiry Man" in Season 3, Episode 19 of The X-Files, Hell Money (originally aired 29 March 1996).

References

External links
 Official Website of Paul Wong Projects
 Official Website of On Main Gallery
 Vtape biography
 Lifetime Collective biography
 The Georgia Straight arts features: Artist Paul Wong is a rebel without a guidebook
 Lisa Steele and Kim Tomczak: The Long Time
 A Space Gallery: The Long Time
 On Main Gallery: Thru the Trapdoor
 VANDOCUMENT: Thru the Trapdoor 
 Mainstreeters: Taking Advantage 1972 - 1982

1954 births
Living people
Canadian multimedia artists
Canadian video artists
Artists from British Columbia
Canadian people of Chinese descent
People from Prince Rupert, British Columbia
Queer artists
Governor General's Award in Visual and Media Arts winners
Canadian LGBT artists
20th-century Canadian artists
20th-century Canadian LGBT people
21st-century Canadian artists
21st-century Canadian LGBT people